The handball competition at the 2007 Pan Arab Games was held in November. Egypt took the gold medal while Algeria and Saudi Arabia won the silver and bronze medals, respectively.

Final classification

Matches

References
 Pan Arab Games on Goalzz - Handball

Events at the 2007 Pan Arab Games
Pan Arab Games
2007